Chruszczewka Włościańska is a village in the administrative district of Gmina Kosów Lacki, within Sokołów County, Masovian Voivodeship, in east-central Poland.

References

Villages in Sokołów County